Megabalanus azoricus, the Azorean barnacle, is a species of large barnacle in the family Balanidae. It is endemic to Macaronesia: the Azores, Madeira, the Canary Islands, and Cape Verde. It is the largest and third most common shallow water barnacle of the Azores, where it is heavily exploited for food and has a high commercial value since the colonization of the islands. It was included in the 100 species for priority management within Macaronesia. It is a thoracopodal filter feeder and the majority are hermaphrodites. It is more abundant in the first  on the low intertidal and infralittoral rocky shores. The empty shells of the barnacles are a vital habitat for the blennies Parablennius ruber, P. incognitus and Coryphoblennius galerita as they provide shelter and substrata for egg deposition during reproduction. A large number of invertebrate species also use the empty shells. Although present throughout the archipelago, it is more abundant in the eastern islands. It has a genetic similarity with Megabalanus tintinnabulum. Some crucial features of the M. azoricus species are digonic hermaphroditism in sessile adults, development of planktotrophic larvae, dependence on exposed rocky shores in the intertidal habitat, and insular distribution restricted to the northeastern Atlantic oceanic islands.

References

Barnacles
Crustaceans of the Atlantic Ocean
Fauna of Macaronesia
Crustaceans described in 1916
Taxa named by Henry Augustus Pilsbry